Arhouriella is arguably the oldest example of a bivalve mollusc in the fossil record. Arguably because there are older contenders to this crown, and because there is not a watertight case that it is a bivalve. The type and only species, Arhouriella opheodontoides, was named and described by Gerd Geyer & Michael Streng in 1998.

References

Fossil taxa described in 1998
Bivalves